L'Amore Primitivo (Aka: Primitive Love, U.S.) is a 1964 Italian comedy film that starred Jayne Mansfield, Mickey Hargitay, Franco and Ciccio, and Carlo Kechler. The film attempts to combine a typical Mansfield sex comedy with the mondo film genre by including footage of various native customs and rituals from around the world.

It was filmed in Italy in May 1964.

Cast
Jayne Mansfield as Dr. Jane (dubbed by Carolyn De Fonseca)
Franco Franchi  as  Franco, Hotel Porter
Ciccio Ingrassia  as  Ciccio, Hotel Porter
Mickey Hargitay  as  Hotel Bell Captain
Carlo Kechler  as  The Professor

Release dates
Italy ... 17 August 1964
United States ... 3 November 1966
France ... January 1967
West Germany ... 5 October 1967
Turkey ... February 1968

References

External links
 

1964 films
1960s sex comedy films
Commedia sexy all'italiana
Films directed by Luigi Scattini
Italian buddy comedy films
1960s buddy comedy films
Films scored by Lallo Gori
1964 comedy films
1960s Italian-language films
1960s Italian films